The 1971 Italian Open was a combined men's and women's tennis tournament that was played by men on outdoor clay courts at the Foro Italico in Rome, Italy. The men's tournament was part of the World Championship Tennis circuit while the women's tournament was a non-tour event, i.e. not part of the Grand Prix or Virginia Slims circuit. The tournament was held from 3 May through 10 May 1971. The singles titles were won by Rod Laver and Virginia Wade.

Finals

Men's singles

 Rod Laver defeated  Jan Kodeš 7–5, 6–3, 6–3

Women's singles
 Virginia Wade defeated  Helga Masthoff 6–4, 6–4

Men's doubles

 John Newcombe /  Tony Roche defeated  Andrés Gimeno /  Roger Taylor 6–4, 6–4

Women's doubles
 Virginia Wade /  Helga Masthoff defeated  Lesley Turner Bowrey /  Helen Gourlay 5–7, 6–2, 6–2

References

External links
 ITF tournament edition details
 ATP tournament profile
 Official tournament website

 
Italian Open
Italian Open (tennis)
Italian Open